Franjo Gregurić (born 12 October 1939) is a Croatian politician who served as Prime Minister of Croatia from July 1991 to September 1992 leading a national unity government at the beginning of the Croatian War of Independence.

Gregurić was born in the Zagorje village of Lobor. He attended the Technical highschool in Zagreb, and then the Technical Faculty of the University of Zagreb.  His work experience included the chemical factories "Radonja" in Sisak, and "Chromos" in Zagreb, where he advanced to the positions of a technical director. He then became a high-ranking official of "Astra", a large state-owned company from Zagreb that exported to the Soviet Union, and Gregurić worked in Moscow for some time.

In the first democratic elections of 1990, Franjo Gregurić entered politics as a member of the Croatian Democratic Union. In the second Croatian government in 1990 he was a deputy prime minister.  On 17 July 1991, he was appointed to the post of prime minister by President Franjo Tuđman.

When he took his post, Croatia was in very difficult situation - its independence, declared on 25 June 1991, was not recognised by the international community and Croatia, unlike Slovenia, lacked proper military infrastructure to resist Krajina rebels backed by Yugoslav People's Army. Only few weeks later, following couple of disastrous setbacks for nascent and inexperienced Croatian military, his cabinet was reshuffled by introducing of members of other political parties represented in Croatian Parliament (with exception of Croatian Party of Rights).

This cabinet, later dubbed as "Government of National Unity", was in charge when major combat operations in Croatia ceased on 3 January 1992, following UN-sponsored armistice. On 15 January 1992 Croatian independence was recognised by major European countries.

This is hailed as the greatest achievement of Gregurić's cabinet, while Gregurić himself enjoyed favourable reputation because of his mild manners and managerial skills. His cabinet was often taken as a great example of national unity under difficult situation.

Those achievements, however, must be taken into proper context. Foreign policy was in hands of Franjo Tuđman, while defence was in hands of Gojko Šušak and military officials responsible only to President. That left Gregurić with more mundane tasks like issuing first Croatian currency and setting up Croatian air traffic control and other institution previously in Yugoslav federal jurisdiction.

With war generally perceived to be over and with prospects of new elections, "Government of National Unity" began to fall apart. In February 1992 his government proposed the laws offering territorial autonomy to ethnic Serbs in Krajina in exchange for their formal recognition of Croatian sovereignty. Dražen Budiša, one of government's ministers and leader of Croatian Social Liberal Party, left the government in protest. This was followed by representative of other parties who gradually left the government.

By the end of his term, cabinet of Franjo Gregurić again had members of only one party.

At parliamentary elections of 1992, Gregurić was elected as representative of HDZ and remained in that party.

Gregurić was later the president of the Croatian Firefighting Association between 1993 and 2000.

In May 2010, Gregurić was appointed the head of the Supervisory board at Institut IGH.

See also 
 Cabinet of Franjo Gregurić

References

1939 births
Living people
People from Lobor
Croatian Democratic Union politicians
Prime Ministers of Croatia
Representatives in the modern Croatian Parliament